L'École Nationale d'assurances  or "French National School of Insurance" is an institute associated with the  French Conservatoire National des Arts et Métiers,  which delivers diplomas in the insurance field: Bachelor of Arts, Master of Arts,  and  Master of Business Administration for executives.

The school has different sections related to the business and insurance industry,
Courses cover numerous insurance topics such as life insurance, health insurance, annuities, Social Security, retirement plans, accident death and dismemberment insurance (AD&D), disability insurance, insurance underwriting, and government laws and rules pertaining to these

See also 

  Conservatoire National des Arts et Métiers

References 
 ENASS' website
 MA Alumni website 
 MBA Insurance Enass Alumni website

Insurance schools
Education in Paris
Business schools in France